FK – 34 Brusno – Ondrej is a Slovak association football club located in Brusno. It currently plays in Majstrovstvá regiónu middle.

Colors and badge 
Its colors are black and white.

References

External links 

 Futbalnet profile 
  

Football clubs in Slovakia
Association football clubs established in 1934
1934 establishments in Slovakia